Patricio Antonio Almendra Cifuentes (born 3 September 1977) is a Chilean former footballer and current football manager.

International career
Almendra made two appearances for the Chile national team in 2001. In addition, he made an appearance for Chile B in the friendly match against Catalonia on 28 December 2001.

Honours

Club
Al-Ahli
 President Cup (1): 2003–04

References

External links
 Patricio Almendra at Football-Lineups
 
 

1977 births
Living people
Sportspeople from Concepción, Chile
Chilean footballers
Chilean expatriate footballers
Chile international footballers
C.D. Huachipato footballers
C.D. Arturo Fernández Vial footballers
Universidad de Concepción footballers
Deportes Concepción (Chile) footballers
Santiago Morning footballers
Football Kingz F.C. players
Al-Gharafa SC players
Al Ahli Club (Dubai) players
Unión Española footballers
Curicó Unido footballers
Chilean Primera División players
Primera B de Chile players
New Zealand Football Championship players
National Soccer League (Australia) players
Qatar Stars League players
UAE Pro League players
Chilean expatriate sportspeople in New Zealand
Chilean expatriate sportspeople in Australia
Chilean expatriate sportspeople in Qatar
Chilean expatriate sportspeople in the United Arab Emirates
Expatriate association footballers in New Zealand
Expatriate soccer players in Australia
Expatriate footballers in Qatar
Expatriate footballers in the United Arab Emirates
Association football midfielders
Chilean football managers
Deportes Concepción (Chile) managers
Santiago Morning managers
Deportes Iberia managers
Primera B de Chile managers
Segunda División Profesional de Chile managers